Johann Ulrich Kraus (also Krauss, Krauß, 1655–1719) was an early German illustrator, engraver and publisher in Augsburg.

He was a student of Melchior Küsel (1626- ca.1683), who was in turn a student of Matthäus Merian the Elder. Kraus became a partner in the Augsburg publishing company of Melchior Küsel, whose daughter Johanna Sibylla he married in 1685.
Kraus became one of the most successful and respected illustraters of his generation in Augsburg. His business was damaged in the War of the Spanish Succession, but Kraus seems to have recovered and in 1717 is recorded in the archives of Augsburg as a wealthy citizen.

Works
ca 1690 Die Verwandlungen des Ovidii in zweyhundert und sechsundzwantzig Kupffern
1694 Biblisches Engel- u. Kunst Werck
1700 Historische Bilder-Bibel / welche besteht in Fünff Theil
1706 Heilige / Augen- und Gemüths-Lust
1710 Tapisseries du roy

References

Wilhelm Schmidt, 'Kraus, Johann Ulrich' in: Allgemeine Deutsche Biographie (ADB). vol. 17, Duncker & Humblot, Leipzig 1883,  73 f.
Christoph Schwingenstein, 'Kraus, Johann Ulrich' in: Neue Deutsche Biographie (NDB). vol. 12, Duncker & Humblot, Berlin 1980,   689 f.

External links

 Johann Ulrich Kraus (1655-1719), National Portrait Gallery, London

1655 births
1719 deaths
Baroque engravers
Engravers from Augsburg